Fire is a studio album by Australian jazz group, Mark Simmonds Freeboppers. It was released in 1993.

At the ARIA Music Awards of 1995 the album won the ARIA Award for Best Jazz Album.

Track listing
CD 1
 "The Spotted Dog" - 8:36
 "On the Road" - 5:41
 "Afghanistan"	- 8:55
 "29th Street Hop"	- 10:00
 "Underground"	- 7:35
 "Mr Sleeze" - 8:32
 "The Jazz Waltz" - 8:54

CD 2
 "Paradise Blues" - 7:25
 "Virtue" - 8:47
 "Crossing the Line" - 8:13
 "Bird-s-hit" - 7:02
 "One for Hawk" - 7:09
 "Take Off" - 8:38
 "Freak Out" - 3:54

References

1993 albums
ARIA Award-winning albums
Jazz albums by Australian artists